Diogmites neoternatus is a species of robber fly in the family Asilidae.  Its genus name, Diogmites, refers to the peculiar habit of hanging by its foreleg while consuming prey.

References

Further reading

External links

 

Asilidae
Articles created by Qbugbot
Insects described in 1951